Sydney Walsh (born in Manhattan, New York) is an American actress. She is perhaps best known for her role as Maureen "Mo" DeMott, a police officer who tries to "save" her gay patrol partner (Joseph Gian) by making passes at him, in the television series Hooperman.

Walsh appeared in the controversial television film An Early Frost, about a young gay lawyer dying of AIDS. It was broadcast on NBC on November 11, 1985, and starred Aidan Quinn, Gena Rowlands, Ben Gazzara and Sylvia Sidney.

She has also made guest appearances on numerous television series including The Twilight Zone, T. J. Hooker, Hunter, Who's the Boss?, Equal Justice, The Young Riders, Murder, She Wrote, Lois & Clark: The New Adventures of Superman, Teamo Supremo, Beyond Belief: Fact or Fiction and The Practice.

In 1990, she appeared in the short-lived ABC police drama Sunset Beat.

She was also a series regular on the sitcom Daddy Dearest and appeared recurringly on Melrose Place and The Young and the Restless.

Some of her film credits are American Gun, Auggie Rose, Point Break, Three Men and a Little Lady and A Nightmare on Elm Street 2: Freddy's Revenge.

Walsh has taught acting at The Acting Corps located in North Hollywood, California. She is an alumna of Williams College.

References

External links

Living people
20th-century American actresses
21st-century American actresses
American acting coaches
Actresses from New York City
American film actresses
American stage actresses
American television actresses
People from Manhattan
Williams College alumni
Year of birth missing (living people)